Pontfaverger-Moronvilliers is a commune in the Marne department in north-eastern France.

Before 1950, when it absorbed part of the territory of Moronvilliers, its name was Pontfaverger. Moronvilliers was destroyed during World War I and never rebuilt.

Geography
The commune is traversed by the Suippe river.

See also
Communes of the Marne department

References

Pontfavergermonronvilliers